Patriotic Union (UPA) was a far-left Chilean political party. It was founded in September 2015 and is led by Eduardo Artés, general secretary of the Chilean Communist Party (Proletarian Action).

Legally registered in 2016, it first appeared in the municipal elections of that year. The party obtained 0.32% of the total votes but no candidates were elected to any council.

It was declared as an anti-imperialist, progressive, patriotic and populist party. Its leader has expressed sympathy with the government of North Korea and the government of President Nicolás Maduro in Venezuela.

For the 2017 elections, the party proclaimed Artés as its presidential candidate, where he finished in seventh place in the first round. The party was dissolved in 2018 for failing to get a minimum percentage of the vote. It was reregistered in 2019, but dissolved again in February 2022 after failing to obtain at least 5% of the vote in the 2021 parliamentary elections.

Presidential candidates 
The following is a list of the presidential candidates supported by the Patriotic Union. (Information gathered from the Archive of Chilean Elections). 
2017: Eduardo Artés (lost)
2021: Eduardo Artés (lost)

References

External links
Unión Patriótica (Chile) 

2015 establishments in Chile
2018 disestablishments in Chile
Anti-imperialist organizations
Communist parties in Chile
Stalinist parties
Anti-revisionist organizations
Far-left politics in Chile
Political parties established in 2015
Political parties in Chile
Progressive parties
United fronts
Political parties disestablished in 2022